Saint-Sébastien-Frêne-Rond is a railway station in Saint-Sébastien-sur-Loire, Pays de la Loire, France. The station is located on the Nantes-Saintes railway. Since 15 June 2011 the station is served by a tram-train service between Nantes and Clisson operated by the SNCF. The following services currently call at Saint-Sébastien-Frêne-Rond:
local service (TER Pays de la Loire) Nantes - Clisson

References

TER Pays de la Loire
Railway stations in Loire-Atlantique